Chester Lamont Clute (February 18, 1891 – April 2, 1956) was an American actor familiar in scores of Hollywood films from his debut in 1930. Diminutive, bald-pated with a bristling moustache, he appeared in mostly unbilled roles, consisting usually of one or two lines, in nearly 250 films.

Biography
Born Chester Lamont Clute in Orange, New Jersey, Clute died of a heart attack  in Woodland Hills, California, aged 65. He is buried at Valhalla Memorial Park Cemetery.

Career
Clute's Broadway credits included Ceiling Zero (1935), Page Miss Glory (1934), Triplets (1932), Oh, Promise Me (1930), The New Yorkers (1927), and She Couldn't Say No (1926).

Selected filmography

 The Dentist (1932)
 Crash Donovan (1936) - Mr. Horner (uncredited)
 Navy Blues (1937) - Uncle Andrew
 There Goes My Girl (1937) - Stu Parker - Whelan's Idea Man
 Dance, Charlie, Dance (1937) - Alvin Gussett
 Exclusive (1937) - Garner
 She Asked for It (1937) - Photographer (uncredited)
 The Wrong Road (1937) - Dan O'Fearna
 The Great Garrick (1937) - M. Moreau
 Live, Love and Learn (1937) - Fake Art Critic Henderson (uncredited)
 Living on Love (1937) - Jessup
 Thoroughbreds Don't Cry (1937) - Man with Toupee (uncredited)
 45 Fathers (1937) - Timid Juror (uncredited)
 Big Town Girl (1937) - Assistant Hotel Manager (uncredited)
 True Confession (1937) - Juror (uncredited)
 Change of Heart (1938) - Tom Jones (uncredited)
 Love Is a Headache (1938) - Pants Salesman (uncredited)
 The Jury's Secret (1938) - Secretary (uncredited)
 Arsène Lupin Returns (1938) - Reporter (uncredited)
 Reckless Living (1938) - Sucker (uncredited)
 He Couldn't Say No (1938) - Musgrave
 Mr. Moto's Gamble (1938) - Ticket Theft Victim (uncredited)
 Go Chase Yourself (1938) - Pushy Little Man in Bank (uncredited)
 Rascals (1938) - Mr. Roger Adams
 Letter of Introduction (1938) - Guest at Cocktail Party (uncredited)
 Mr. Chump (1938) - Ed Mason
 Keep Smiling (1938) - Auctioneer (uncredited)
 Sing You Sinners (1938) - Race Tout at Lunch Counter (uncredited)
 You Can't Take It with You (1938) - Hammond (uncredited)
 Personal Secretary (1938) - Levering (uncredited)
 Youth Takes a Fling (1938) - Salesman
 Touchdown, Army (1938) - Mr. Rawlings (uncredited)
 Service de Luxe (1938) - Chester Bainbridge
 Hard to Get (1938) - Mr. Pinkey (uncredited)
 Annabel Takes a Tour (1938) - Pitcarin, Rodney-Marlborough Hotel Manager
 Comet Over Broadway (1938) - Willis
 Artists and Models Abroad (1938) - Simpson
 Pardon Our Nerve (1939) - Mr. Flemingwell
 I Was a Convict (1939) - Evans
 Dodge City (1939) - Coggins (uncredited)
 East Side of Heaven (1939) - Phil (uncredited)
 Bachelor Mother (1939) - Oliver - Man in Park (uncredited)
 The Spellbinder (1939) - Dr. Hillary Schunk (uncredited)
 Miracles for Sale (1939) - Waiter with Sugar (uncredited)
 Dust Be My Destiny (1939) - Movie Theatre Manager (uncredited)
 Dancing Co-Ed (1939) - Braddock
 Television Spy (1939) - Harry Payne
 Too Busy to Work (1939) - Springer
 Laugh It Off (1939) - Eliot Rigby
 The Honeymoon's Over (1939) - Higginsby (uncredited)
 Thou Shalt Not Kill (1939) - Waiter (uncredited)
 Invisible Stripes (1939)
 Remember the Night (1940) - Jewelry Salesman (uncredited)
 The Man Who Wouldn't Talk (1940) - Pompous Man (uncredited)
 Blondie on a Budget (1940) - Ticket Agent (uncredited)
 The Doctor Takes a Wife (1940) - Johnson
 My Favorite Wife (1940) - Shoe Salesman (uncredited)
 Turnabout (1940) - Briggs (uncredited)
 Millionaires in Prison (1940) - Sidney Keats
 Wildcat Bus (1940) - Man Reading Repossession Notice (uncredited)
 Dance, Girl, Dance (1940) - Bailey #2
 Hired Wife (1940) - Martin Peabody - Justice of the Peace (uncredited)
 Public Deb No. 1 (1940) - Car Payment Man (uncredited)
 Too Many Girls (1940) - Lister
 A Little Bit of Heaven (1940) - Mr. Dixon
 Who Killed Aunt Maggie? (1940) - Justice of the Peace (uncredited)
 She Couldn't Say No (1940) - Ezra Pine
 Love Thy Neighbor (1940) - Judge
 This Thing Called Love (1940) - Bit Part (uncredited)
 Tall, Dark and Handsome (1941) - Floorwalker (uncredited)
 Footlight Fever (1941) - Mr. Holly - Parker's Secretary (uncredited)
 They Met in Argentina (1941) - B.A. Jackson, Hastings' Secretary (uncredited)
 She Knew All the Answers (1941) - Butter and Egg Man
 Hurry, Charlie, Hurry (1941) - Cardwell, Daniel's Secretary (uncredited)
 Manpower (1941) - Drug Store Clerk (uncredited)
 Sun Valley Serenade (1941) - Process Server
 Scattergood Meets Broadway (1941) - Quentin Van Deusen
 Unfinished Business (1941) - Mr. Beck (uncredited)
 The Smiling Ghost (1941) - Homely Woman's Husband (uncredited)
 Hold Back the Dawn (1941) - Man in Climax Bar (uncredited)
 Niagara Falls (1941) - Potter
 Three Girls About Town (1941) - Frank - Magician (uncredited)
 New York Town (1941) - Mr. Cobbler (uncredited)
 Look Who's Laughing (1941) - Mr. Blaize (scenes deleted)
 The Perfect Snob (1941) - Nibsie Nicholson
 Bedtime Story (1941) - Second Desk Clerk (uncredited)
 The Man Who Came to Dinner (1942)
 All Through the Night (1942) - Westmore Hotel Clerk (uncredited)
 The Fleet's In (1942) - Justice of the Peace (uncredited)
 A Tragedy at Midnight (1942) - Pierre (uncredited)
 Valley of the Sun (1942) - Wilbur (uncredited)
 The Lady Is Willing (1942) - Income Tax Man (uncredited)
 The Remarkable Andrew (1942) - Sam Marbery (uncredited)
 Larceny, Inc. (1942) - Mr. Buchanan
 The Wife Takes a Flyer (1942) - Adolphe Bietjelboer
 The Spoilers (1942) - Mr. Montrose - Clerk (uncredited)
 This Gun for Hire (1942) - Rooming House Manager
 Meet the Stewarts (1942) - Mr. Hamilton, Club Manager (uncredited)
 My Favorite Spy (1942) - Higgenbotham
 Yankee Doodle Dandy (1942) - Harold Goff
 Joan of Ozark (1942) - Salesman (uncredited)
 Tales of Manhattan (1942) - Mr. Langehanke (Fields sequence) (uncredited)
 Pardon My Sarong (1942) - Bus Company Checker (uncredited)
 Just Off Broadway (1942) - Sperty
 Henry Aldrich, Editor (1942) - Drug Store Clerk
 Get Hep to Love (1942) - Mr. Tolly (uncredited)
 The Forest Rangers (1942) - Judge (uncredited)
 George Washington Slept Here (1942) - Apartment Hunter (uncredited)
 Star Spangled Rhythm (1942) - Air-Raid Warden - Bob Hope Skit (uncredited)
 No Place for a Lady (1943) - Yvonne
 The Meanest Man in the World (1943) - Lawyer (uncredited)
 Sagebrush Law (1943) - Cowhand with Whiskey Jug (uncredited)
 Chatterbox (1943) - Wilfred Peckinpaugh
 The More the Merrier (1943) - Hotel Clerk (uncredited)
 Three Hearts for Julia (1943) - Man with Binoculars (uncredited)
 The Desperadoes (1943) - Rollo (uncredited)
 False Faces (1943) - Apartment Manager
 Du Barry Was a Lady (1943) - Dr. Pullit (uncredited)
 Crime Doctor (1943) - Headwaiter (uncredited)
 The Good Fellows (1943) - Abner Merritt (uncredited)
 Someone to Remember (1943) - Mr. Roseby
 The West Side Kid (1943) - Gwylim
 So's Your Uncle (1943) - Dinwiddle
 I Dood It (1943) - Hotel Manager With Flowers (uncredited)
 Crazy House (1943) - Fud
 Princess O'Rourke (1943) - Mr. Mookle (uncredited)
 Swing Fever (1943) - Mr. Milbane, Manager of Telephone Company (uncredited)
 Here Comes Elmer (1943) - Postelwaite
 What a Woman (1943) - Dormitory Clerk (uncredited)
 Sing a Jingle (1944) - Hendricks (uncredited)
 Henry Aldrich, Boy Scout (1944) - Mr. Pollup (uncredited)
 Hat Check Honey (1944) - Uniformed Officer
 Rationing (1944) - Roberts
 Bermuda Mystery (1944) - Angela's Father (uncredited)
 3 Men in White (1944) - Mr. Burns (uncredited)
 Johnny Doesn't Live Here Any More (1944) - Mr. Collins
 Reckless Age (1944) - Jerkins
 Arsenic and Old Lace (1944) - Dr. Gilchrist
 Ever Since Venus (1944) - Milquetoast Customer (uncredited)
 San Diego, I Love You (1944) - Percy Caldwell
 My Gal Loves Music (1944) - Doctor (uncredited)
 Nothing but Trouble (1944) - Clerk in 1944 (uncredited)
 The Falcon in Hollywood (1944) - Hotel Manager (uncredited)
 The Town Went Wild (1944) - Mr. Kurtz (uncredited)
 Lake Placid Serenade (1944) - Haines (uncredited)
 Nothing But the Truth (1944)
 She Gets Her Man (1945) - Charlie, in Play
 Roughly Speaking (1945) - The Proprietor (uncredited)
 The Man Who Walked Alone (1945) - Mr. Monroe
 The Clock (1945) - Michael Henry, Judge's Clerk (uncredited)
 Earl Carroll Vanities (1945) - Mr. Weems
 Two O'Clock Courage (1945) - Mr. Daniels (uncredited)
 Swing Out, Sister (1945) - Mr. Gaston (uncredited)
 Blonde Ransom (1945) - Clerk
 Dangerous Partners (1945) - The Diner (uncredited)
 Wonder Man (1945) - Man on Bus (uncredited)
 Blonde from Brooklyn (1945) - Mr. Weams (uncredited)
 On Stage Everybody (1945) - Tupper (uncredited)
 Anchors Aweigh (1945) - Iturbi's Assistant
 Guest Wife (1945) - Urban Nichols
 Lady on a Train (1945) - Train Conductor (uncredited)
 Arson Squad (1945) - Sam Purdy
 Mildred Pierce (1945) - Mr. Jones (uncredited)
 Abbott and Costello in Hollywood (1945) - Mr. Burvis (uncredited)
 She Went to the Races (1945) - Wallace Mason
 Sing Your Way Home (1945) - Heathcliffe (uncredited)
 Saratoga Trunk (1945) - Hotel Clerk (uncredited)
 The Sailor Takes a Wife (1945) - Lone Diner (uncredited)
 The Gentleman Misbehaves (1946) - Quackenbush (uncredited)
 Cinderella Jones (1946) - Krencher
 To Each His Own (1946) - Clarence Ingham (uncredited)
 Two Sisters from Boston (1946) - George - Opera Stage Doorman (uncredited)
 One Exciting Week (1946) - Mayor Clarence Teeple
 Inside Job (1946) - Husband (uncredited)
 Night and Day (1946) - Music Publisher (uncredited)
 Canyon Passage (1946) - Portland Storekeeper (uncredited)
 Two Guys from Milwaukee (1946) - Manicure Customer - Mr. Carruthers (uncredited)
 Down Missouri Way (1946) - Prof. Shaw
 Spook Busters (1946) - Brown
 Angel on My Shoulder (1946) - Kramer (uncredited)
 No Leave, No Love (1946) - Mr. Tansey (uncredited)
 That Brennan Girl (1946) - Man in Night Club with Quarter (uncredited)
 The Secret Heart (1946) - Old Man (uncredited)
 The Time, the Place and the Girl (1946) - Jeff's Apartment Manager (uncredited)
 Easy Come, Easy Go (1947) - Waiter (uncredited)
 Suddenly It's Spring (1947) - Workman (uncredited)
 Hit Parade of 1947 (1947) - Radio Station Assistant (uncredited)
 It Happened on Fifth Avenue (1947) - Phillips (uncredited)
 A Likely Story (1947) - Doctor Brown (uncredited)
 Copacabana (1947) - Hotel Night Clerk (uncredited)
 Web of Danger (1947) - Cornflakes Eater
 Living in a Big Way (1947) - Union Leader (uncredited)
 The Crimson Key (1947) - Hotel Clerk (uncredited)
 The Perils of Pauline (1947) - Willie Millick (uncredited)
 Something in the Wind (1947) - Albert Beamis (uncredited)
 Joe Palooka in the Knockout (1947) - Hotel Clerk
 Always Together (1947) - Furrier (uncredited)
 Mary Lou (1948) - Cheever Chesney
 On Our Merry Way (1948) - Bank Teller (uncredited)
 On an Island with You (1948) - Tommy (uncredited)
 Best Man Wins (1948) - Villager (uncredited)
 Blondie's Reward (1948) - Leroy J. Blodgett
 Train to Alcatraz (1948) - Train Conductor Yelvington
 Joe Palooka in Winner Take All (1948) - Doniger
 Singin' Spurs (1948) - Mr. Totter
 The Strange Mrs. Crane (1948) - Fred Marlow
 Jiggs and Maggie in Court (1948) - Worker
 Blondie's Big Deal (1949) - Mayor A.K. Ramsey
 My Dream Is Yours (1949) - Party Guest (uncredited)
 Ringside (1949) - Timid Man
 The Girl from Jones Beach (1949) - Collection Agent (uncredited)
 Mighty Joe Young (1949) - Doctor (uncredited)
 In the Good Old Summertime (1949) - Sheet Music Customer (uncredited)
 Mary Ryan, Detective (1950) - Chester Wiggin (uncredited)
 Square Dance Jubilee (1949) - Yes-Man
 Bride for Sale (1949) - Mr. Baker (uncredited)
 Master Minds (1949) - Mike Barton
 The Great Lover (1949) - Passenger Drinking in Cabin (uncredited)
 Bodyhold (1949) - Little Spectator in Crowd (uncredited)
 The Good Humor Man (1950) - Meek Man (uncredited)
 Kill the Umpire (1950) - Man Talking to Wife on Phone (uncredited)
 Lucky Losers (1950) - Conventioneer from Paducah
 Joe Palooka in Humphrey Takes a Chance (1950) - Upperbottom
 Hit Parade of 1951 (1950) - Haberdashery Clerk (uncredited)
 Belle Le Grand (1951) - Secretary (uncredited)
 Stop That Cab (1951) - Lucy's Father
 Kentucky Jubilee (1951) - Mayor Horace Tilbury
 All That I Have (1951) - Juror Meek
 Colorado Sundown (1952) - Lawyer Davis
 Scared Stiff (1953) - Man with Spaghetti on Head (uncredited) (final film role)

References

External links

American male film actors
1891 births
1956 deaths
Burials at Valhalla Memorial Park Cemetery
20th-century American male actors
American male stage actors
Male actors from New Jersey